Apollonia Vanova (Slovak: Apolónia Váňová) is a Slovak-born actress and opera singer, known for her roles as Silhouette in the film version of Watchmen and as the leading Wraith Queen and leader of a Wraith Alliance in the Stargate: Atlantis episode "The Queen". She played a role in ABC Family's Samurai Girl. She also played Nadira, one of General Zod's Kryptonian soldiers in Man of Steel.

Born in Slovakia, Vanova was raised near Vancouver, British Columbia, Canada.

References

External links

Year of birth missing (living people)
Living people
Slovak actresses
Slovak emigrants to Canada
Canadian musical theatre actresses
21st-century Slovak women opera singers